Pisanu is an Italian surname. Notable people with the surname include:

Andrea Pisanu (born 1982), Italian footballer and coach
Giuseppe Pisanu (born 1937), Italian politician

See also
Pisano (disambiguation)

Italian-language surnames